Rudi Schuricke (born Erhard Rudolf Hans Schuricke; 16 March 1913, Brandenburg an der Havel – 28 December 1973) was a popular German singer and actor. In the 1930s he was Second Tenor with the Kardosch Singers, a popular vocal ensemble of the time. When the group dissolved in 1935, Schuricke joined the Spree Revellers and later proceeded to found his own vocal group, the Schuricke Terzett. He also appeared as a solo singer with many popular orchestras of the 1930s and 40s. His 1949 recording of "Capri-Fischer" was a "smash hit" in Germany. Even as late as the mid-1950s, he was still a successful musical artist. In 1954 alone, his song "Moulin Rouge" was the 74th most purchased single on the German year-end chart and another of his songs "Das Märchen unserer Liebe" appeared on the German Top50 chart. The advent of the rock 'n' roll age, however, soon made his music out-dated.

Schuricke tried to make a comeback in the early 1960s. At the time of his comeback, Billboard Magazine referred to him as "one of Germany's hottest recording stars of former years." Schuricke returned to the music charts in 1980, when a compilation of his songs, Noch einmal mit Gefühl, reached the No. 6 spot on the German albums chart. It remained on the chart for ten weeks.

Discography

His solo recordings include:

 Capri-Fischer (Die Spitzenreiter 1949 – Record 47001 Polydor, firstly recorded in 1943)
 Abends in Napoli (Die Spitzenreiter 1949 – Record 47001 Polydor)
 Auf Wiedersehn (Die Spitzenreiter 1950 – Record 47002 Polydor)
 Florentinische Nächte (Die Spitzenreiter 1950 – Record 47002 Polydor)
 Dreh Dich Noch Einmal Um
 Einmal Wirst Du Wieder Bei Mir Sein
 Es War ein Traum Cherie
 Es Werden Wieder Rosen Blüh’n
 Glaube Mir / Mütterlein
 Heimat, Deine Sterne
 Ja und Nein
 Komm Bald Wieder
 Komm' Zurück
 Lilli und Luise
 Moulin Rouge (Ein Lied aus Paris)
 O Mia Bella Napoli
 Optimismus ist die Beste Medizin
 Penny Serenade
 Schenk Mir Dein Lächeln, Maria
 So eine Liebe Gibt es Einmal Nur
 Wenn der Schnee Fällt auf die Rosen
 So Leb Dein Leben (My Way) (seine letzte Single 1973)
 Stern von Rio
 Tarantella
 Tulpen aus Amsterdam (von Ernst Bader)
 Und Wieder Geht ein Schöner Tag zu Ende
 Warum Weinst Du, Kleine Tamara
 Wenn Du in Meinen Träumen Bei Mir Bist (Over the Rainbow)
 Hm Hm, Du Bist so Zauberhaft

References

Sources
  
  
Josef Westner. Rudi Schuricke Biography with photos on grammophon-platten.de/

External links
 Rudi Schuricke on Discogs

1913 births
1973 deaths
People from Brandenburg an der Havel
People from the Province of Brandenburg
20th-century German male singers